Ashley Putnam (born 10 August 1952) is an American soprano from New York City. Her professional singing career began in 1976 and has spanned over 30 years.

Early life and career
Ashley Putnam began her music career playing the flute. Her mother was an amateur singer and was a regular soloist at the church where she also sang in the choir. The young Ashley began playing the flute and attended the Interlochen Center for the Arts in the summers during high school. Upon graduation from high school, Ashley enrolled at the University of Michigan School of Music as a flute major. There she sang in the university choirs and realized she had vocal potential when she was given solos in choir. She soon switched to a vocal major and, in 1973, was an apprentice singer with the Santa Fe Opera during its summer festival.

She completed her Bachelor of Music degree program in May, 1974, and then began her graduate studies at UM. She returned to Santa Fe's Apprentice Singer Program in summer 1975, and then finished her Master of Music degree in December, 1975. She notably studied singing with Ellen Faull. In the spring of 1976, Ashley was one of two winners of the Metropolitan Opera National Council Auditions.

Professional career
After winning the MET Auditions, Ashley's career took off. Her operatic roles have included Violetta (La traviata), Mimi (La bohème), Lucia (Lucia di Lammermoor), Arabella (Arabella), Fiordiligi (Così fan tutte), Musetta (La bohème), Vitellia (La clemenza di Tito), Anna Maurrant (Street Scene), and many others.

Known for her wide-ranging repertoire, expressive acting, and glamorous presence, Putnam has performed in the world's most prestigious opera houses, including Covent Garden, Vienna Staatsoper, Berlin Staatsoper, La Fenice, and in the US, the Metropolitan Opera, Chicago Lyric Opera and San Francisco Opera

Her concert credits include performances with the New York Philharmonic, the Concertgebouw, and the San Francisco Symphony.

Ashley Putnam is now a member of the voice faculty at the Manhattan School of Music, and has a private studio in New York. She has taught masterclasses throughout the country, adjudicates for the Metropolitan Opera National Council Auditions, and has served on the voice faculties of DePaul University and the Eastman School of Music of the University of Rochester. However, she was not a professor of voice at either institution.

Recordings
Audio
Puccini: La bohème, "Musetta"; Sir Colin Davis, conductor; Phillips, 1979.
Thea Musgrave: Mary, Queen of Scots, "Mary"; Peter Mark, conductor; Moss Music, 1978.
Divas of a Certain Age, "Diva II" and "Cecily"; Jay Meetze, conductor; Albany Records, 2006.

Video
Street Scene, "Anna Maurrant"; German Television, Produced by Zambello, 1994.
La clemenza di Tito, "Vitellia"; Glyndebourne, conducted by Sir Colin Davis, produced by Hytner, 1991.
Così fan tutte, "Fiordiligi"; BBC, produced by Miller, 1985.
Arabella, "Arabella"; Glyndebourne, conducted by Bernard Haitink, produced by Cox, 1984

References
Notes

Sources

Manhattan School of Music, Ashley Putnam faculty page
Bargreen, Melinda (18 April 1993). "Diva: Ashley Putnam Makes Merry With 'Widow' Role". The Seattle Times.
McFadden, Robert D. (19 September 1982). "Soprano, In the Audience, Steps in for Sick Colleague". The New York Times.
"Ashley Putnam, at 26, just might be an opera legend in the making". People. (6 November 1978).
Rich, Alan (17 September 1979). "A Year A Week, And A Day After Her City Opera Debut, Ashley Putnam Gets Her Own Production". New York.
Rovner, Sandy (20 April 1985). "On a Friendly Note". The Washington Post.
Swann, Annalyn (17 April 1978). "Queen Mary in Virginia". Time.
Wadsworth, Stephen (22 March 1981). "She Sings Queen Mary in Donizetti and Musgrave". The New York Times.

1952 births
Living people
American operatic sopranos
University of Michigan School of Music, Theatre & Dance alumni
DePaul University faculty
Eastman School of Music faculty
Singers from New York City
Winners of the Metropolitan Opera National Council Auditions
20th-century American women opera singers
21st-century American women opera singers
Classical musicians from New York (state)
Women music educators
American women academics